Ram Lal Anand College (RLA) is located in New Delhi, India. It was established in 1964, and has been one of the University of Delhi maintained colleges since 1973. It awards degrees under the purview of the University and offers courses at the undergraduate level.

The college is situated in the South Campus of University of Delhi. It is a co-educational college that admits students and selects teachers from all communities irrespective of gender, caste, religion and physical challenges.

History
Ram Lal Anand College was founded in the year 1964 by Late Shri Ram Lal Anand, a senior advocate in the Supreme Court of India, in response to the growing social demand in the sixties for providing educational opportunities at the university level. The college was initially managed by the Ram Lal Anand College Trust. It was later taken over by the University of Delhi. Since 1973, it has been run by the University of Delhi as a University Maintained Institution.

In 2014, Ram lal Anand College (Evening) became a new college named Aryabhatta College. So, the area of the college was divided amongst the two colleges. The new building of Aryabhatta college is being built. Currently, both colleges share the same sports ground. After, the building of Aryabhatta college is complete, the area will be taken over by Ram lal Anand College.

Facilities
The college features a ground where sports and cultural events are held. It has a canteen which serves hygienic food to the students. The college offers a Programme of Mentorship conducted by the teachers of all the departments. It has a seminar hall and a beautiful auditorium -Amphi Theatre with capacity of 200+ seats. College facilities include wi-fi, sports room, activity room and an in-development computer centre.  There are ramps and toilets for disabled people (PWD, physically challenged people).

Library
The college library contains over 1,00,000 books and a reading room with e-books, giving the students an environment to develop with both the technology and the physical material. The students can find a wide variety of stuff to explore from.

Courses offered 
Undergraduate and postgraduate courses were offered in morning and evening shifts under the aegis of University of Delhi, but changed after the creation of Aryabhatta College. It now offers courses only in morning shift.

Postgraduate courses 
 Master of Arts (M.A.) in Hindi

Undergraduate courses 
B.A. (Hons)  English
 B.A. (Hons) Hindi
 B.A. (Hons) Political Science
 B.A. (Hons) History 
 B.A. (Hons)  Hindi Journalism & Mass Communication
 B.A. Programme 
 B.Com. (Hons)
 B.Com. Programme 
 B.Sc. (Hons) Computer Science
 B.Sc. (Hons) Geology 
 B.Sc. (Hons) Microbiology
 Bachelor of Management studies (B.M.S)
 B.Sc. (Hons) Statistics
 B.Sc. (Hons) Mathematics
 Physical Education
 Economics & Insurance
 Bachelor of Technology Hons in Computer Science (approved by AICTE) discontinued after 2014, there is only one batch known as FYUP 2013 Batch.

Student life
The college offers students the opportunity to actively participate in sports and various cultural activities. Students may also engage in debates, dialogue sessions and seminars conducted at the college. The college also has NCC, under 7 Delhi Battalion Unit. The Ramlal Lal Anand College NCC Cadets participate in international, national, regional camps of NCC.

References

External links
 Ram Lal Anand College

Universities and colleges in Delhi
Delhi University
1964 establishments in Delhi
Educational institutions established in 1964